Scuppernong River may refer to:

Scuppernong River (North Carolina)
Scuppernong River (Wisconsin)